Știința Stadium is a football stadium in Timișoara. Opened in 1928, the stadium is located on the campus of the Polytechnic University of Timișoara. The stadium has an athletics track, an electronic scoreboard, floodlights, as well as facilities for athletes (locker rooms, showers, gym, etc.). Politehnica Timișoara, the city's flagship team, played on this stadium until the construction of Dan Păltinișanu Stadium. It is now used by Liga II team SSU Politehnica Timișoara.

In 2020, the National Investment Company approved an extensive expansion and modernization project that provides for increasing the capacity of the grandstands to 3,000 seats, rooftop minifootball fields, various sports spaces and functions, as well as an above-ground parking lot.

References 

Buildings and structures in Timișoara
Football venues in Romania